The Sakarwar, also known as Sikarwar, Sikriwal or Sakarwal is a clan of Rajputs mainly  found in certain parts of North and Eastern India. They ruled Pahargarh Estate the city of Sikri from 7th till 16th century (now called Fatehpur Sikri), before it was conquered by Babur, the founder of Mughal empire in India and passed into the hands of Turkic sultans. They play important role in Battle of Khanwa. It was time when Sikarwar had fought battle against Babur's army under alliance of Rajputs which was led by Rana Sanga. One famous Sikarwar ruler is Maharaja Kam Dev Misir.

As Sikri fell under Turkic administration, Sikarwars broke up into two branches, which migrated in different regions.

In Uttar Pradesh, they established Gahmar village in Ghazipur. In Bihar, the Sikarwar established the settlements of Kudra, Chainpur and Bhabua. One branch in Madhya Pradesh dwelled around pahargarh.

Chainpur
The area of Chainpur in Kaimur district of Bihar was historically ruled by Sikarwar Rajputs. A document called the Kursinama purports  to trace the ancestry of the Chainpur family to Fatehpur Sikri where the family was driven out during the Turkic Muslim ruler Babur's conquest , when he won battle of Khanwa.   

As they fled eastwards under the leadership of Lakshmi Mal, they eventually conquered Chainpur from the Chero dynasty which was ruled by the Chero tribe.

Among the most important rulers of the Chainpur Sikarwars was Raja Salivahana who built Chainpur fort and was prominent in the region prior to the ascendancy of the Afghan warlord Sher Shah Suri.

Role in 1857 uprising
Under the leadership of a local chieftain, Meghar Singh, many Sikarwars in Zamania in Ghazipur district of Eastern Uttar Pradesh and from Kaimur district of Bihar took part in the 1857 rebellion against British rule.

Meghar Singh eventually accepted the leadership of Babu Amar Singh of Jagdishpur and the Sikarwars and the Ujjainiyas became allies. However, by November most of the rebels had surrendered and accepted British rule.

References

Rajput clans of Bihar
Rajput clans of Uttar Pradesh
Rajput clans of Madhya Pradesh